This article was split from List of museums in Texas

The list of museums in West Texas encompasses museums defined for this context as institutions (including nonprofit organizations, government entities, and private businesses) that collect and care for objects of cultural, artistic, scientific, or historical interest and make their collections or related exhibits available for public viewing.  Museums that exist only in cyberspace (i.e., virtual museums) are not included.  Also included are nonprofit art galleries and exhibit spaces.

West Texas
West Texas  is a vernacular term applied to a region in the southwestern quadrant of the United States that primarily encompasses the arid and semiarid lands in the western portion of the state of Texas.

The counties included are Andrews, Bailey, Borden, Brewster, Brown, Callahan, Cochran, Coke, Coleman, Concho, Crane, Crockett, Crosby, Culberson, Dawson, Dickens, Eastland, Ector, El Paso, Fisher, Floyd, Gaines, Garza, Glasscock, Hale, Haskell, Hockley, Howard, Hudspeth, Irion, Jeff Davis, Jones, Kent, Kimble, King, Knox, Lamb, Loving, Lubbock, Lynn, Martin, Mason, McCulloch, Menard, Midland, Mitchell, Motley, Nolan, Pecos, Presidio, Reagan, Reeves, Runnels, Schleicher, Scurry, Shackelford, Stephens, Sterling, Stonewall, Sutton, Taylor, Terrell, Terry, Throckmorton, Tom Green, Upton, Ward, Winkler, and Yoakum.

Museums in West Texas, listed by county

Anderson - Brown

Callahan - Dickens

Eastland - Ector

El Paso County

Floyd - Knox

Lamb - Lynn

Martin - Nolan

Pecos - Runnels

Schleicher -  Sutton

Taylor - Terry

Tom Green - Yoakim

Defunct museums
 El Paso Explorium, El Paso, closed in 2015
 El Paso Firefighters Museum

See also

 List of museums in Texas
 List of museums in East Texas
 List of museums in the Texas Gulf Coast
 List of museums in North Texas
 List of museums in the Texas Panhandle
 List of museums in South Texas
 List of museums in Central Texas

Resources
Texas Association of Museums
Historic House Museums in Texas

References

Lists of museums in Texas
Museums in El Paso, Texas